Noa Kazado Yakar (born November 26, 2003) is an Israeli acrobatic gymnast.
She was the silver medalist at the 2018 Youth Olympic Games in the acrobatic gymnastics mixed pair event, along with her partner Yonatan Fridman. They achieved a score of 27.590 (losing by 0.260 points to the team from Bulgaria). They dedicated their performance to the late boyfriend of their coach, who had died in a motorcycle accident.

Her coach is Shiran Ouaknine.

See also
Israel at the Youth Olympics

References 

2003 births
Living people
Israeli acrobatic gymnasts
Gymnasts at the 2018 Summer Youth Olympics